Al-Mazar was a Palestinian Arab village in the District of Jenin. Situated on Mount Gilboa, its history stretched back to the period of Mamluk rule over Palestine (13th century). An agricultural village, it was depopulated during the 1948 Palestine war, and incorporated into the newly established state of Israel. The Israeli villages of Prazon, Meitav, and Gan Ner were established on al-Mazar's former lands.

Location
The village was located on the flat, circular peak of the mountain known in biblical scripture as Mount Gilboa, and locally as Mount al-Mazar or Djebel Foukou'ah ("Mount of Mushrooms"), with steep slopes on all sides excepting the southeast. It was joined to the neighbouring village of Nuris by a dirt path.

History
The village may have been named al-Mazar (Arabic for "shrine", "a place one visits") because it was a burial place of many of those who fell in the Battle of Ain Jalut between the Mamluks and the Mongols in 1260. The villagers traced their origins to the al-Sadiyyun nomads, who in turn were descended from Shaykh Sad al-Din al-Shaybani (died 1224), a prominent Sufi mystic from the Jaba village on the Golan.

Ottoman era
During the period of Ottoman rule over Palestine, al-Mazar was captured and burned by Napoleon's troops in April 1799 during the Syrian leg of his military campaign in Egypt. Pierre Jacotin named  the village Nazer on his map from that campaign.

In 1870, V. Guérin visited al-Mazar, describing it as a village with about 500 inhabitants, situated at the peak of Djebel Foukou'ah, and surrounded by a belt of gigantic cactus plants. Numerous wells carved in the rock were said to point to the antiquity of the village. From the village, he could see the whole of Djebel Foukou'ah, which he identifies as the Mount Gilboa of biblical scripture, as well as the Jezreel Valley, the Little Hermon (actually Djebel Dhahy), Mount Tabor, and further north, the snowy peaks of Mount Hermon. Also seen from the village to the west and northwest were the Plain of Esdraelon and the Carmel Mountains; to the south, the mountains around Jenin; and to the east, before the Jordan River, what he calls the ancient country of Galaad. He notes that the name of Mount Gilboa is preserved in the name of the village of Djelboun, also situated on the mountain. Descending the mountain towards the west-southwest, at the base of the village of al-Mazar, he notes the presence of a spring of the same name, Ain el-Mezar, and on the slopes of this side of the mountain, which are less steep, there were olive trees and wheat being cultivated.

In the 1882  the PEF's Survey of Western Palestine (SWP) described  the place as: "a village on the summit of the mountain. It is principally built of stone, and has a well to the south-east. A few olives surround the houses. The site is very rocky. It is inhabited by Derwishes, and is a place of Muslim pilgrimage."

British Mandate era
In the 1922 census of Palestine, conducted  by the British Mandate authorities, al-Mazar had a population of 223, all Muslims, increasing slightly  in the 1931 census to 257, still all Muslims, in a total of  62 inhabited houses. The village was home to Sheik Farhan al Sadi, a prominent leader in the 1936 Arab revolt in Palestine. In 1937, at the age of 75, he was executed by the British authorities for his participation in the revolt.

Agriculture was the backbone of the village economy, which was based on grain, fruit, legume, and olive cultivation. In  the 1945 statistics the population of Al-Mazar was 270 Muslims, with a total of 14,501 dunams of land. Of this,   5,221 dunums  were used for cereals, 229 dunums were irrigated or used for orchards, of which 68 dunums were for olives, while 9 dunams were built-up (urban) land.

Farhan al-Sa'di (1856–1937) was born in al-Mazar. He is thought to be the first to use a weapon during the 1936 revolt.

1948 and aftermath
On 19 April 1948, Palmah HQ (headquarters) ordered the OC (operational command) of the First Battalion to, "destroy enemy bases in Mazar,  Nuris and Zir'in [..] Comment: with the capture of Zir'in, most of the village houses must be destroyed while [some] should be left intact for accommodation and defence." According to Benny Morris, the Israeli historian, the policy of destroying the Palestinian villages was characteristic of Haganah attacks in April–May 1948, just before the outbreak of the 1948 Arab–Israeli war. However, the specific orders for al-Mazar were either not acted upon, or did not succeed at once, as the village was not occupied until 30 May 1948. By that time, it had been captured after an attack by Israeli soldiers from the Golani Brigade, along with the village of Nuris, which lay at the foot of the mountain.

Following the war, the area was incorporated into the State of Israel and three villages were subsequently established on the land of al-Mazar; Prazon in 1953, Meitav in 1954, and Gan Ner in 1987. The Palestinian historian Walid Khalidi described what remained of al-Mazar in 1992:The site is overgrown with thorns and cactuses and strewn with stone rubble. None of the village houses or landmarks remains. Almond trees and cactuses grow on parts of the village lands. The hilly lands are used as grazing areas, and other parts are covered with forest.

References

Bibliography

External links
Welcome To al-Mazar
al-Mazar (Jenin), from  the Zochrot
Survey of Western Palestine, Map 9:   IAA, Wikimedia commons
Al-Mazar, from  the Khalil Sakakini Cultural Center
Al-Mazar

Arab villages depopulated prior to the 1948 Arab–Israeli War
District of Jenin
Former populated places in the State of Palestine